General elections were held in Liechtenstein on 8 February 2009. While polls and pundits predicted few changes, the Christian democratic Patriotic Union (VU) gained an outright majority in the Landtag, whilst the national conservative Progressive Citizens' Party (FBP) and the green social democratic Free List (FL) both suffered losses.

Results

By electoral district

References

Liechtenstein
Elections in Liechtenstein
2009 in Liechtenstein
February 2009 events in Europe